Hypothetical is a British television comedy panel show created by British comedian Josh Widdicombe, with Tom Craine and Matthew Crosby. Widdicombe hosts the show alongside fellow comedian James Acaster. The TV series features teams of celebrity guests (often comedians), who are presented with a bizarre hypothetical situation by Widdicombe. The guests must explain how they would deal with the situation, following the rules given by Acaster, who then awards points based on how well he thinks they have done. The show was first broadcast on Dave on 6 February 2019.

In May 2022, a podcast based on the programme—Hypothetical: The Podcast—began. In the same month, the fourth series of Hypothetical premiered.

Format 
The general format of the show involves the host, Josh Widdicombe, presenting the guests with a hypothetical situation to which they must provide their take on the best way of approaching the given situation, following the rules laid out by James Acaster. The guest is then awarded points by Acaster, from 0 to 5, based on the quality of their answers, and the team with the most points at the end of the show wins. After awarding the points Acaster may present his solution to the hypothetical situation that would have gained all 5 points. In addition to general discussion between the hosts and guests, the show also features pre-recorded filmed inserts, and some role-play of the guests' suggested solution with James Acaster in the studio. There are several different rounds in the show:

 What Would You Do? - Panelists are given a hypothetical situation and are asked how they would deal with it. This question may be given to one panelist, or two facing-off each other to see who has the best answer. Up to five points are given in this round.
 Not For a Million Quid - All four panelists are ask how much they would have to paid to endure a particular hypothetical situation. The person who bids the lowest has to prove they can carry out the hypothetical, but if Acaster believes the bid is not genuine he can disqualify them. Up to three points are rewarded.
 The Great Wall of Celebrities - The panel have to guess how certain celebrity guests responded to different hypotheticals. In the first series there was a single celebrity per episode, but from series two onwards six celebrities appear in each episode, and the teams take it turns to pick one per question. One point is given for each right answer.
 The Randomiser (Series 2–3) - A hypothetical situation is generated at random using three tombola machines, for either one panelist or two facing-off to deal with. Up to five points are rewarded.
 James's Wishlist (Series 4) - Two panelists go head-to-head to achieve a personal hypothetical situation which Acaster wishes to come true. Up to five points are rewarded.
 On The Spot (Series 4) - Widdicombe gives a series of rapid-fire hypothetical questions against the clock. Acaster nominates a panelist to answer it as fast as they can. If Widdicombe or Acaster are not satisfied with the answer, they pause the clock and make the panelist give a more detailed response. The best panelist scores just one point for their team in this round.
 Big Hat Small Hat - The final round, dubbed by the Widdicombe as the "stone cold original" hypothetical question. The team with the lowest score picks one of the celebrities from "The Great Wall of Celebrities" (in Series 1 there was no choice as there was only one celebrity per episode) and has to guess whether that celebrity would decide to wear a big hat or a small hat. The rules as described by Acaster are: "You have to wear the hat every day for the rest of your life, you cannot wear a medium-sized hat over the small hat, and these are the hats", these being a ridiculously large and ridiculously tiny top hat. The points offered are always one point more than gap between the two teams, meaning the episode result always hinges on getting the answer right.

Production 
Hypothetical was devised by Widdicombe with Matthew Crosby and Tom Craine, who also act as writers. The initial idea of the show was pitched via a WhatsApp conversation, and subsequently developed by London-based Hat Trick Productions and commissioned as a UKTV Original for Dave by Richard Watsham, UKTV's director of commissioning and Steve North, genre general manager for entertainment and comedy, in July 2018. Joe McVey was announced as executive producer alongside Stu Mather at Hat Trick Productions with Sophie Le Good as producer. From series 2 Henry Paker was also a writer on the show.

The show is filmed in front of a live audience at Pinewood Studios. The first series was filmed in August and September 2018. Acaster and Widdicombe have previously worked together, with Acaster appearing often as a guest on Widdicombe's XFM (now Radio X) show.

Widdicombe said of the TV show, and working with Acaster:“I have spent the last decade of my life annoying other comics with these questions in cars and dressing rooms so I am delighted Dave have allowed me to claim that I was in fact researching a show and not just wasting everyone’s time. More to the point I cannot wait to work alongside the man who makes me laugh more than anyone else in comedy. I just hope this goes better than our 2009 Edinburgh show (one star, Three Weeks magazine).”This 2009 Edinburgh show was the work of Widdicombe, Acaster and Nick Helm, and, according to Widdicombe, the criticism they received for it was read out during filming of Hypothetical to warm up the audience.

The announcement of Hypothetical caused controversy due to a perceived similarity to the Danielle Ward podcast Do The Right Thing which had been made into a television pilot but not commissioned.

Episodes

Series 1 (2019)
Series 1 was broadcast on Wednesdays at 10pm on Dave, with episodes available On-Demand at UKTV Play. Each episode features four guest panellists in two teams of two, alongside the hosts Widdicombe and Acaster.

Series 2 (2020)

Series 3 (2021)

Series 4 (2022)

Accolades
In 2022 Acaster received a nomination in the Outstanding Male Comedy Entertainment Performance at the National Comedy Awards for his work on the show; the award was given posthumously to Sean Lock.

Notes

References

External links
 
 
 
 

2019 British television series debuts
English-language television shows
British panel games
2010s British game shows
2020s British game shows
Dave (TV channel) original programming
Television series by Hat Trick Productions
2010s British comedy television series
2020s British comedy television series